Janina Uhse (born 2 October 1989 in Husum, West Germany) is a German actress.

Life and career 
Uhse comes from a fairground family and she practiced acting at an early age. She began her acting career when she was nine years old, and her first role was in the TV series Die Kinder vom Alstertal. Shortly afterwards, she appeared in the TV show Die Pfefferkörner. In 2002, she made her first film debut in the movie Der Rattenkönig. Then from 2002 to 2008 she played the role of Melanie Peschke in Der Landarzt.

Ever since 2008, she has been in the TV series Gute Zeiten, schlechte Zeiten. In 2012, she went to college in Los Angeles to study acting.

Filmography 
 2002–2003: Die Kinder vom Alstertal
 2002: Der Rattenkönig
 2003: Die Pfefferkörner
 2003–2008: Der Landarzt
 2005: Die Rettungsflieger
 2008–2017: Gute Zeiten, schlechte Zeiten
 2011: Küstenwache
 2016: 
 2016: Leg dich nicht mit Klara an
 2017: Donna Leon
 2017: High Society
 2018: 
 2018: Unsere Jungs 
 2020: Betonrausch
 2020: Berlin, Berlin
 2020: Es ist zu deinem Besten
 2022:

References

External links 
 
 Official Website of Janina Uhse.

20th-century German actresses
Living people
1989 births
21st-century German actresses
German film actresses
German television actresses
German child actresses
People from Husum